Awards presented by the PEN American Center (today PEN America) that are no longer active.

The awards are among many PEN awards sponsored by International PEN in over 145 PEN centres around the world. The PEN American Center awards have been characterized as being among the "major" American literary prizes.

PEN/Barbara Goldsmith Freedom to Write Award (1987–2015) 
The PEN/Barbara Goldsmith Freedom to Write Award was an award that honored writers anywhere in the world who have fought courageously in the face of adversity for the right to freedom of expression. Established in 1987, the award was administered by PEN American Center and underwritten by PEN trustee Barbara Goldsmith. The last award was in 2015; its successor is PEN/Barbey Freedom to Write Award, established in 2016 and honoring writers who were imprisoned for their work.

Winners

PEN/Steven Kroll Award (2012–2014)
The PEN/Steven Kroll Award was awarded by the PEN American Center "to acknowledge the distinct literary contributions of picture book writers." Established in memory of Steven Kroll, a former PEN Trustee and Chair of PEN's Children's/Young Adult Book Authors Committee, this honor was awarded for the first time in 2012 for a book published in 2011. The last award was given in 2014.

Winners

PEN/W.G. Sebald Award (2010–2011)
The PEN/W.G. Sebald Award for a Fiction Writer in Mid-Career was awarded by the PEN American Center to honor a promising writer who has published three works of fiction.

Winners

PEN Emerging Writers Awards (2011)
The PEN Emerging Writers Awards was awarded by the PEN American Center. It was awarded to up-and-coming authors whose writing had been featured in distinguished literary journals, but had not published book-length works. Three prizes were awarded: one fiction, one nonfiction, and one poetry. Candidates were only nominated by editors from print and online journals. Participating journals for 2011 included: 6 x 6, A Public Space, Bloom, Colorado Review, Creative Nonfiction, Fence, Gargoyle, Glimmer Train, Guernica, Harvard Review, jubilat, Kenyon Review, Lungfull!, New York Quarterly, One Story, The Oxford American, Ploughshares, Rain Taxi, Spinning Jenny, and Tin House.

Winners

PEN/Amazon.com Short Story Award (2000)
The PEN/Amazon.com Short Story Award was given to unpublished writers who submit original short story manuscripts. Each manuscript competed for a $10,000 cash grant and publication at Amazon.com and in The Boston Book Review. Award was active for one year.

Architectural Digest Award for Literary Writing on the Visual Arts (2000–2001)
The Architectural Digest Award for Literary Writing on the Visual Arts was presented for literary writing on the visual arts. It was active two years 2000–2001.

Gregory Kolovakos Award (1992–2004)
The Gregory Kolovakos Award was a literary award given every three years by PEN American Center to a U.S. literary translator, editor, or critic "whose work, in meeting the challenge of cultural difference, extends Gregory Kolovakos's commitment to the richness of Hispanic literature and to expanding its English-language audience". It was primarily intended to recognize translations into English from Spanish, but translations from other Hispanic languages were also eligible. Gregory Kolovakos was a graduate of Yale University and served as the director of the Literature Program of the New York State Council on the Arts for many years.  He was also the founding executive director of the Gay and Lesbian Alliance Against Defamation in 1985. The monetary amount of the Award was USD $2000. The prize was first given in 1992.

Winners

Jerard Fund Award (2001–2005)
The Jerard Fund Award honored a work in progress of general nonfiction distinguished by high literary quality by a woman at the midpoint in her career. Presented every 2 years, it was active from 2001 to 2005.

Martha Albrand Award for the Art of the Memoir (1998–2006)
The Martha Albrand Award for the Art of the Memoir was presented for a first published memoir. It was active from 1998 to 2006.

Martha Albrand Award for First Nonfiction (1989–2006)
The Martha Albrand Award for First Nonfiction was presented for an American author's first-published book of general nonfiction. It was active from 1989 to 2006.

PEN/Newman's Own First Amendment Award (1993–2006)
The PEN/Newman's Own First Amendment Award was an award presented annually from 1993 to 2006 to a U.S. resident who "fought courageously, despite adversity, to safeguard the First Amendment right to freedom of expression as it applies to the written word." Sponsored by PEN American Center and Newman's Own, a cash prize of $20,000 was awarded. It was active from 1993 to 2006.

Winners

PEN/Katherine Anne Porter First Amendment Award (2008)
The PEN/Katherine Anne Porter First Amendment Award was presented for only one year. It was meant to given to a U.S. resident "who has fought courageously, despite adversity, to safeguard the First Amendment right to freedom of expression as it applies to the written word." Sponsored by PEN American Center and Katherine Anne Porter Foundation, the award included a cash prize of US$10,000. The award succeeded the PEN/Newman's Own First Amendment Award which was last awarded in 2006. The award was given in 2008 only.

Winner

Renato Poggioli Translation Award (1991–2000)
The Renato Poggioli Translation Award was for a translator at work on an English-language version of Italian literature. Active from 1991 to  2000.

Roger Klein Award for Career Achievement (1971–2000)
The Roger Klein Award for Career Achievement was presented to a trade book editor every two years for "distinguished editorial achievement." It was active from 1971 to  2000.
|To a trade book editor every two years for "distinguished editorial achievement."

Roger Klein Award for Editing
The Roger Klein Award for Editing was an honor "given [every two years] to an outstanding editor in trade hardcover publishing." It was active from 1971 to  2000.

References

Former awards